Fraction Fever is an educational video game created by Tom Snyder Productions and published by Spinnaker Software in 1983. The TRS-80 version was sold through Radio Shack. The game involves moving a pogo stick laterally on a platform to find a fraction equivalent to the one shown on-screen.

Reception
Ahoy! unfavorably reviewed the game, criticizing the graphics and "very annoying" sound and stating that "Other than the Chinese water torture, I'm hard pressed to think of a more frustrating or annoying experience for children than trying to play Spinnaker's Fraction Fever. Just ask my kids!"

References

External links 
 Intro and game screens
 Manual (broken link) 

1983 video games
Atari 8-bit family games
Children's educational video games
ColecoVision games
Commodore 64 games
Single-player video games
Spinnaker Software games
TRS-80 games
Video games developed in the United States
ZX Spectrum games